Heuchera sanguinea, called coral bells, is a species of flowering plant in the genus Heuchera, native to the US states of Arizona and New Mexico, and to northern Mexico. A number of cultivars are commercially available. The Latin specific epithet sanguinea means blood-red, in reference to the color of the flowers. Flowers are deep pink to red, sweetly fragrant, and bell-shaped. Heuchera sanguinea is a perennial herb. The plant attracts bees and hummingbirds.

References

sanguinea
Garden plants of North America
Plants described in 1848